The Dutch Eredivisie in the 1957–58 season was contested by 18 teams. At the end of the competition, Door Oefening Sterk (DOS) and SC Enschede shared the lead with 47 points. According to the rules, an extra match was required. It was played at a neutral field (De Goffert, Nijmegen) and Door Oefening Sterk won the championship by winning 1-0 after extra time.

Another play-off was held to determine which team had to relegate. Elinkwijk played GVAV at neutral terrain and won 2–1. Therefore, GVAV relegated.

League standings

Championship play-off

DOS won the championship, and qualified for 1958–59 European Cup.

Relegation play-off

GVAV were relegated to Eerste Divisie.

Results

See also 
 1957–58 Eerste Divisie
 1957–58 Tweede Divisie

References 

 RSSSF

Eredivisie seasons
1957–58 in Dutch football
Neth